Tetronarce fairchildi, commonly known as the New Zealand torpedo, is a species of electric ray of the family Torpedinidae found only around New Zealand, at depths of between 5 and 1,100 m. This species is placed in the genus Tetronarce.

In June 2018 the New Zealand Department of Conservation classified the T. fairchildi as "Data Deficient" under the New Zealand Threat Classification System.

References

Endemic marine fish of New Zealand
Ovoviviparous fish
Tetronarce
Fish described in 1872
Strongly electric fish